Lisa Stevens is an American editor, CEO and founder of Paizo Publishing, and COO of Goblinworks. She began her career in games in the 1980s, working with Jonathan Tweet and Mark Rein•Hagen to help produce the tabletop roleplaying game Ars Magica. She later worked at White Wolf and Wizards of the Coast before founding Paizo. She announced her gradual retirement from her role in June 2020.

Education
Stevens attended Saint Olaf College, where she met game designers Jonathan Tweet and Mark Rein-Hagen. Stevens received an MBA from the University of Washington. After graduating, she continued to hang out on campus running Dungeons & Dragons games.

Career
Stevens joined Tweet and Rein-Hagen in the game company Lion Rampant, which published Ars Magica in 1987. Lion Rampant was a volunteer organization, and Stevens's editorial experience was needed at the company. After Stevens pitched the idea to Rein-Hagen and Stewart Wieck, Lion Rampant merged with White Wolf in 1990. While on the road to GenCon 23 in 1990 with Stevens and Wieck, Rein-Hagen envisioned Vampire: The Masquerade, which the new company published in 1991. After meeting Rich Kaalaas of Wizards of the Coast at a GTS convention in March 1991 and then GenCon 25, Stevens left White Wolf that same year to join Wizards, becoming that company's first full-time employee. She was a vice president for Wizards when they published Magic: The Gathering in 1993, and she launched The Duelist to support it. Having worked on the game while at Lion Rampant, she advised Wizards to acquire Ars Magica, which they did in 1994. After Wizards purchased TSR, Stevens became the Brand Manager for the RPGA and Greyhawk.

She is also an expert on Star Wars collectibles, and was the brand manager for Wizards' Star Wars Roleplaying Game.

Stevens left Wizards of the Coast in 2000, and made it known that she wanted to acquire the rights to Wizards' magazines if they ever became available. In May 2002, she formed Paizo Publishing, and is the CEO of the company. When Wizards' entire magazine department was cut in 2002, Dragon, Dungeon, and Star Wars Insider magazines were all licensed to Paizo.

In 2011, Paizo set up a company called GoblinWorks with Stevens as COO to handle the development of Pathfinder Online, a massively multiplayer online role-playing game.

On June 15, 2020 Paizo announced that Stevens was going to step down from daily operations in preparation for her retirement.

References

External links
 

21st-century American women
American women writers
Dungeons & Dragons game designers
Living people
St. Olaf College alumni
White Wolf game designers
Women science fiction and fantasy writers
Year of birth missing (living people)